Stranger in Town is a 1931 American pre-Code drama film directed by Erle C. Kenton and starring Charles "Chic" Sale and Ann Dvorak.

Cast 
 Charles "Chic" Sale - Ulysses Crickle
 Ann Dvorak - Marian Crickle
 David Manners - Jerry Fleming
 Noah Beery Sr. - J.B. Hilliker
 Raymond Hatton - Elmer
 Lyle Talbot - Brice

References

External links 

1931 films
1931 drama films
American drama films
American black-and-white films
Warner Bros. films
Films directed by Erle C. Kenton
1930s English-language films
1930s American films